is a Japanese mainstream film actress who is best known for her roles in Nikkatsu's Roman Porno film series.

Life and career
Shima was born Keiko Ishida in the Shinjuku district of Tokyo, Japan on December 3, 1953. Ishida made her acting debut by 1975, using the alias Keiko Ono, in the TV series Taiyō ni Hoero!, but this alias was soon changed to avoid confusion with another actress. Ishida also used the aliases Emi Shirakawa and Nozomi Shirakawa during this period.

In 1977, Ishida came under exclusive contract with Nikkatsu studio and was given the stage name "Izumi Shima". She made her debut with the studio in the August 1977 Roman Porno film Lady Chatterley In Tokyo. Nikkatsu promoted Shima for this film as their "most beautiful actress" and the cinematography in the film was designed specifically to highlight her attractiveness. However, due to the disappointing reception of Lady Chatterley In Tokyo, Shima was relegated to low profile and supporting roles for years. According to noted SM-author Oniroku Dan, who was also her sexual partner, she failed to overcome her timid and restrained mood for roles that required physical intimacy, which contrasted sharply with her passionate off-screen sex life.

During this time, Shima appeared in a number of S&M works including the 1980 Blazing Bondage Lady and the 1982 Female Beautician Rope Discipline both written by Oniroku Dan. When Oniroku Dan, seemingly unhappy with the fate of his scripts, decided to produce his own film, Dark Hair, Velvet Soul in 1982, he brought in respected pink film director Mamoru Watanabe to direct the film and he also chose Shima for the starring role. According to the Weissers, Shima brought "elegance and panache" to her role and after this successful appearance, she made S&M films her specialty and became regarded as one of Nikkatsu's leading S&M actresses of the 1980s. Nikkatsu's  in the period 1982 - 1983, Shima was usually cast as the staple dominatrix type in her later films.

Season of Infidelity
Four of Oniroku Dan’s stories, originally published in Japanese in 1997, were published in English in 2010 by Vertical, Inc. The collection of these stories is titled Season of Infidelity; the collection’s last story, Bewitching Bloom, is a telling of Dan’s relationship with Naomi Tani, and also includes notes about three subsequent Nikkatsu "Queens"; Shima, Junko Mabuki, and Miki Takakura.

Nikkatsu filmography
  (Nikkatsu, Aug. 1977)
  (Dec. 1977)
  (Jan. 1978)
  (Mar. 1978)
  (Apr. 1978)
  (Jun. 1978)
  (Aug. 1978)
  (Oct. 1978)
  (Dec. 1978)
  (Feb. 1979)
  (Mar. 1979)
  (Jun. 1979)
  (Oct. 1979)
  (Oct. 1979)
  (Jan. 1980)
  (Feb. 1980)
  (May 1980)
  (Jul. 1980)
  (Sep. 1980)
  (Dec. 1980)
  (Jan. 1981)
  (May 1981)
  (Jun. 1981)
  (Nov. 1981)
  (Oni Pro / Nikkatsu, Mar. 1982)
  (May 1982)
  (Aug. 1982)
  (Jan. 1983)
  (Oni Pro / Nikkatsu, Feb. 1983)
  (Dec. 1985)
  (Aug. 1986)
  (Jan. 1988)

References

External links
 

Actresses from Tokyo
Nikkatsu SM Queens
People from Shinjuku
Japanese film actresses
Pink film actors
1953 births
Living people